Permit mail is anything sent through the postal service where postage is paid by a post office issued permit.  No postage stamp is affixed to letters sent by permit mail.

The post office will bill the sender based on the number of items sent, their weight, etc.

Advantages of permit mail:
 The sender does not have to affix postage stamps to the mail
 The sender does not have to safeguard postage stamps from employee theft
 The post office does not have to cancel any stamps, thus requiring less work to deliver the mail.

United States Postal Service